Radhakrishna Vikhe Patil is an Indian politician, and a 7-time undefeated MLA from Shirdi Vidhan Sabha Constituency in Ahmednagar district of Maharashtra. He is currently the Minister for Revenue, in the Government of Maharashtra and was the 1st Minister sworn in the Eknath Shinde ministry expansion, after Eknath Shinde and Devendra Fadnavis in the Cabinet Expansion held on 9 August 2022. Radhakrishna Vikhe Patil has been a member of the Maharashtra Vidhan Sabha since 1995. He was elected in the 2014 with 1,21,459 votes and most recently in 2019 with record breaking 1,32,316 votes.

He is a 7-time undefeated MLA from Shirdi in Ahmednagar district of Maharashtra. He has worked under 6 different Chief Ministers since 1995 and has held 12 different portfolios in his career.

Positions Held :

 Minister of Revenue in the Eknath Shinde ministry (2022–Present)
 Minister of Housing in the First Fadnavis ministry (2019 - 2019)
 Leader of Opposition, Maharashtra Vidhan Sabha (2014 - 2019)
 Minister of Agriculture, Food & Drug Administration, Marathi Language, and Other Backward Classes in the Prithviraj Chavan ministry (2010 - 2014)
 Minister of Transport, Ports, and Law & Judiciary in the Second Ashok Chavan ministry (2009 - 2010)
 Minister of School Education in the First Ashok Chavan ministry (2008 - 2009)
 Minister of Skill Development & Entrepreneurship, and Earthquake Rehabilitation in the Manohar Joshi ministry, Narayan Rane ministry. (1995 - 1999)

Radhakrishna Vikhe Patil was the Leader of Opposition from 2014 to 2019 during has First Fadnavis Government. Then Chief Minister Devendra Fadnavis, who has an excellent relationship with Radhakrishna Vikhe Patil, ensured a defection of Vikhe Patil, his Son Dr. Sujay, and other Congress and they all joined the Bharatiya Janata party in July 2019. Radhakrishna Vikhe Patil is the son of veteran Maharashtra and former union Minister of Finance (India), Balasaheb Vikhe Patil. He has a son, Dr. Sujay Radhakrishna Vikhe Patil who is a Member of Parliament of the BJP from the Ahmednagar Lok Sabha since 2019, which he won by securing more than 700,000 votes and defeated NCP's Sangram Jagtap. Prime Minister Narendra Modi and then Chief Minister Devendra Fadnavis had campaigned for Dr. Sujay Vikhe during the 2019 Lok Sabha elections.

References

External links
support Satyajeet Tambe or not, said Radhakrishna Vikhe Patil

Living people
Indian National Congress politicians
Shiv Sena politicians
Marathi politicians
People from Shirdi
State cabinet ministers of Maharashtra
Maharashtra MLAs 2014–2019
Leaders of the Opposition in the Maharashtra Legislative Assembly
1957 births
Bharatiya Janata Party politicians from Maharashtra